Peter Kauzer (born 8 September 1983) is a Slovenian slalom canoeist who has competed at the international level since 1999.

Career

Kauzer has competed at four Summer Olympics. He finished 13th in the K1 event at the 2008 Summer Olympics in Beijing after being eliminated in the semi-finals. Four years later at the London games he was one of the top favorites for gold in the K1 event. He made the final after recording the fastest time in the semi-final, but after a disappointing run in the final he could only finish in sixth place. He was also the Slovenian flag-bearer at the London games. He won his first Olympic medal, a silver in the K1 event, at the 2016 Summer Olympics in Rio de Janeiro. He then finished 12th in the K1 event at the 2020 Summer Olympics in Tokyo after being eliminated in the semi-final.

He won six medals at the ICF Canoe Slalom World Championships with two golds (K1: 2009, 2011) and four bronzes (K1: 2017, K1 team: 2005, 2017, 2021).

Kauzer won the overall World Cup title in 2009, 2011 and 2015 in K1. At the European Championships he won a total of 13 medals (6 golds, 4 silvers and 3 bronzes). Kauzer finished the 2009 season as the World No. 1 in the K1 event.

World Cup individual podiums

1 European Championship counting for World Cup points
2 Pan American Championship counting for World Cup points

References

  – accessed 13 September 2009.

External links

1983 births
Living people
Canoeists at the 2008 Summer Olympics
Canoeists at the 2012 Summer Olympics
Canoeists at the 2016 Summer Olympics
Olympic canoeists of Slovenia
Slovenian male canoeists
People from Trbovlje
People from Hrastnik
Olympic silver medalists for Slovenia
Medalists at the 2016 Summer Olympics
Olympic medalists in canoeing
Medalists at the ICF Canoe Slalom World Championships
Canoeists at the 2020 Summer Olympics